Peter Francis Ryan (born 2 April 1940) was a rugby union player who represented Australia.

Ryan, a fullback, was born in Queanbeyan, New South Wales and claimed a total of 4 international rugby caps for Australia.

References

Published sources
 Howell, Max (2006) Born to Lead - Wallaby Test Captains (2005) Celebrity Books, New Zealand

Australian rugby union players
Australia international rugby union players
1940 births
Living people
Rugby union players from New South Wales
Rugby union fullbacks